State Road 105 (SR 105) is a  north-south state highway in northeastern Jacksonville, Florida. It travels from an interchange with Interstate 95 (I-95) just north of downtown eastward (signed north) along the north bank of the St. Johns River to an intersection with SR A1A, at the Mayport Ferry, and then along SR A1A to the end of SR 200 in Fernandina Beach.

SR 105 is the only access road to the Jacksonville Zoo and Gardens. In fact, the entire road was named Heckscher Drive for years. However, the section from I-95 east to I-295 East Beltway was renamed Zoo Parkway.

Route description
SR 105 begins at an interchange with I-95. From there, SR 105 can be characterized as a four-lane mid-speed highway that parallels the north bank of the St. Johns River through a rural area. After , traffic slows down briefly to a pair of traffic lights. In between the traffic lights, there are on-ramps for access to Interstate 295 (I-295). 
After the traffic lights, SR 105 begins to travel through marshland along the St. Johns River. During this stretch, SR 105 intersects all the roads that cross the St. Johns River. After intersecting Dave Rawls Boulevard, SR 105 thins down to a two-lane highway. The road proceeds to travel through mostly marshland, crossing over Little Clapboard Creek and Sisters Creek. After  of travelling through marshland, SR 105 intersects SR A1A, which crosses the St. Johns River via the Mayport Ferry. At this point, signage disappears for SR 105 as it converges with SR A1A. 
SR 105 follows SR A1A over Fort George Inlet and through Little Talbot Island State Park and Big Talbot Island State Park. SR 105 then crosses the mouth of the Nassau River into Amelia City. SR 105 follows the beach due north until its reaches its northern terminus in Fernandina Beach.

History
SR 105 travels concurrent with SR A1A from the Mayport Ferry up to Fernandina Beach, however, over the years, signage has been removed.

Major intersections

See also
 
 
 List of state roads in Florida

References

105
105
105
105
Former toll roads in Florida
Fernandina Beach, Florida